Callistethus is a genus of shining leaf chafers in the beetle family Scarabaeidae. There are at least 130 described species in Callistethus.

See also
 List of Callistethus species

References

Further reading

External links

 

Rutelinae